× Cyathidaria is an intergeneric hybrid of Cyathea and Cnemidaria tree ferns.

Species 
 × Cyathidaria acunae Caluff & Shelton, 2002
 × Cyathidaria elliottii (Baker) Caluff & Shelton, 2002
 × Cyathidaria hombersleyi (Maxon) Caluff & Shelton, 2002
 × Cyathidaria sessilifolia (Jenman) Caluff & Shelton, 2002
 × Cyathidaria wilsonii (Hooker) Caluff & Shelton, 2002

References 

 Caluff, M. G. 2002. ×Cyathidaria, a new nothogenus in the Cyatheaceae (Pteridophyta). Willdenowia 32: 281-283. 

Cyatheaceae
Plant nothogenera
Fern genera